Rosenbergia rubra is a species of beetle in the family Cerambycidae. It was described by Gilmour in 1966.

References

Batocerini
Beetles described in 1966